Dennis Mark Hertel (born December 7, 1948) is an American politician and lawyer from Michigan. From 1981 to 1993, he served six terms in the  U.S. House of Representatives.

Early life and education
Hertel was born in Detroit, Michigan, where he attended the public schools, graduating from Denby High School in 1967. He received a B.A. from Eastern Michigan University in 1971 and a J.D. from Wayne State University in 1974. He was admitted to the Michigan bar in 1975 and commenced practice in Detroit.

Political career
He served in the Michigan House of Representatives, 1975–1980, representing the 12th district.

Congress 
Hertel was elected as a Democrat from Michigan's 14th congressional district to the 97th United States Congress and to the five succeeding Congresses, serving from January 3, 1981 to January 3, 1993. He was not a candidate for renomination in 1992, primarily because his old district was split into four other districts which all had Democratic incumbents.

Post-political career
Since leaving the Congress he has practiced law with the firm of Johnson, Rosati, Galica, Labarge, Aseltyne, Sugameli & Field, P.C. Hertel is now a Senior Counselor with The Livingston Group in Washington, D.C.

After leaving office, he became involved in political reform efforts, including joining nine other former members of Congress to co-author a 2021 opinion editorial advocating reforms of Congress. He is also a member of the ReFormers Caucus of Issue One.

Personal life
He is a resident of Harper Woods, Michigan.

References

External links

The Political Graveyard
The Livingston Group, L.L.C.

1948 births
Living people
Politicians from Detroit
People from Harper Woods, Michigan
Democratic Party members of the Michigan House of Representatives
Eastern Michigan University alumni
Wayne State University alumni
Michigan lawyers
Lawyers from Washington, D.C.
Democratic Party members of the United States House of Representatives from Michigan
Denby High School alumni
Members of Congress who became lobbyists